André Sergeyi Hovnanyan (born July 8, 1979), better known by the mononym André is an Armenian singer. Andre is currently one of the most popular pop stars of Armenia, winning the Best Male Singer trophy at various Armenia Music Awards in 2004–2018.

Andre started singing at the age of three using a chair as his first stage and his family as his first audience. Three years later he was enrolled into a musical school. Although a war was taking its toll on the country and its people, the only guiding light and hope for Andre was the music and his dream of singing. These events led him to write his first song “Prayer” at the early age of nine.

Upon winning the musical contest “Road to Renaissance” at the age of fifteen, he laid the foundation of his professional career. While working for 5 years at the State Theater of Music, he pursued his education at the Yerevan State Conservatory of Music and obtained his PHD. Though his journey began on a small stage, he has gone on to perform on many stages while conquering the hearts of millions throughout the world.

Besides, he has been a judge in several big television shows like “Pop Idol”, “My name is…”, “Premiere” and “The X Factor”. During “The X Factor” his team became an absolute winner and he made a world record in “The X Factor” history. Andre also has his own reality show called “Andrenaline”

Since 2005 Andre's producer is Anush Hovnanyan.

Early life
At the age of three André started singing with his family as audience. Three years later he began taking piano classes, and at the age of nine he wrote his first song, which he called Prayer, showing his appreciation towards God. His professional singing career started at the age of 15 when he won the music contest Road to Renaissance. For the last few years, André has been the lead vocalist of the pop-jazz band Karabakh, with whom he has toured all over Armenia and the Nagorno-Karabakh Republic. He has participated in numerous music festivals in Asia, Eastern Europe and the United States, winning many of them and finishing top three in a few others. He performed a track with Australian R&B/Pop Singer Samantha Jade titled Come Back.

Armenia enters Eurovision 
In 2006 he was the first artist to represent Armenia in the Eurovision Song Contest, performing one of the 37 songs in Athens. There André sang "Without Your Love", a mixture between modern Western and traditional Armenian music. The song was composed by an Armenian celebrity, Armen Martirosyan, the conductor of the Armenian Jazz Orchestra. The instrumentation and arrangement was done by one of Armenian music business' most highly regarded persons, Ara Torosyan. The producer and director of the song and Andre's performance at Eurovision was Anush Hovnanyan. ARMTV presented their Eurovision Song Contest 2006 entry to the public on March 15, 2006. After qualifying through the semi-final André finished in 8th place in the competition with 129 points.

Discography

Albums 
 Es em (It's Me) (2003)
 Miayn Ser (Only Love) (2005)
 1000x (1000 times) (2006)
 My Love to You (DVD) (2008)
 Yerjankutyan Gaghtnik (2008)
 ANDREnaline (2010)
 Im Hogi (2014)

Singles 
 My Love To You (2005)
 Without Your Love (2006)

Awards and nominations
This is a list of the awards won by the Armenian singer André.

2001 – International music contest “Golden Skif” – Donetsk, Ukraine – The first runner-up
2001 – International music contest “Golden shlyager” – Mogilev, Belarus – Third runner-up
2002 – International music festival "Voice of Asia" – Almaty, Kazakhstan
2003 – International Youth music festival “Festos” – Moscow, Russia – Golden Diploma Award
2003 – Shanghai Asia International Music Festival - Shanghai, China – Excellent New Singer
2003 – Armenian Song of the Year – Moscow, Russia – The greatest contributor in Armenian Music
2003 – Best Song of the Year at Hit FM Radio for song “Antsa – gnatsi”
2004 – World Championships of Performing Arts – Hollywood, USA – 3 golden and 1 silver medals, is found "The Champion of the world"
2004 – Krunk pan-Armenian music festival – Yerevan, Armenia – Best singer of the year
2004 – “Golden Qnar” contest/festival – Yerevan, Armenia – Best Song of the Year “My love to you”
2005 – National Music awards – Best singer of the year
2005 – Los Angeles, USA – The Key of Glendale
2006 – Moscow, Russia – Person of the year
2006 – Tashir 2006 – Moscow, Russia – Prize "Avance"
2006 – M Club Music awards – Kodak Theatre, Hollywood, USA – Best Male singer & Best Armenian International artist – The Varduhi Vardanyan Achievement Award
2009 – Tashir 2009 – Moscow, Russia – Singer of Decade
2009 - Armenian music awards & M Club music awards - Nokia Theatre, USA - The ambassador of Armenian music

See also 
 List of awards received by André
 Eurovision Song Contest 2006

References 

21st-century Armenian male singers
Living people
Eurovision Song Contest entrants for Armenia
Eurovision Song Contest entrants of 2006
People from Stepanakert
Armenian pop singers
1979 births